Shutonia is a genus of sea snails, marine gastropod mollusks in the family Pseudomelatomidae, the turrids and allies.

Species
Species within the genus Shutonia include:
 Shutonia variabilis (Schepman, 1913)

References

 van der Bijl, A.N. (1993). Shutonia, a new generic name for Schepmania Shuto, 1970, non Haas, 1913 (Gastropoda Prosobranchia, Turridae). Basteria. 57: 146

External links
 
 Bouchet, P.; Kantor, Y. I.; Sysoev, A.; Puillandre, N. (2011). A new operational classification of the Conoidea (Gastropoda). Journal of Molluscan Studies. 77(3): 273-308
 Worldwide Mollusc Species Data Base: Pseudomelatomidae

 
Pseudomelatomidae
Monotypic gastropod genera